Eremophila jamesiorum is a flowering plant in the figwort family, Scrophulariaceae and is endemic to Western Australia. It is a wispy, sticky shrub with narrow linear leaves and white flowers tinged with pink or mauve. It is only known from a few locations in the Gibson Desert.

Description
The outside of the petal tube is covered with soft hairs and the inside is mostly glabrous apart from a few soft hairs. The 4 stamens are enclosed by the petal tube. Flowering time is mainly in August and September.

Taxonomy and naming
Eremophila jamesiorum was first formally described by Bevan Buirchell and Andrew Brown in 2016 and the description was published in Nuytsia. The specific epithet (jamesiorum) honours Phil and Marlene James, owners of a wholesale commercial plant nursery in Kalamunda.

Distribution and habitat
This eremophila is found between "Carnegie Station" north east of Wiluna to the Alfred Marie Range in the Gibson Desert Nature Reserve, within the Gascoyne and Gibson Desert biogeographic regions, growing in clay soils at the base of hills.

Conservation status
Eremophila jamesiorum has been classified as "Priority Two" by the Western Australian Government Department of Parks and Wildlife meaning that it is poorly known and from only one or a few locations.

References

jamesiorum
Eudicots of Western Australia
Plants described in 2016
Taxa named by Bevan Buirchell
Taxa named by Andrew Phillip Brown